2019 Hong Kong Rural Representative election was held in January 2019 to elect 1,540 Rural Representatives in the New Territories of Hong Kong. This is the first time pro-democracy camp formed electoral alliance to run in the rural election, despite co-initiator Eddie Chu was disqualified and the alliance failed to gain any seats.

Electoral system 

A total of 1,540 seats were open for election. Each Existing Village elects one Resident Representatives, while Indigenous Village & Composite Indigenous Village elects one to five Indigenous Inhabitants Representatives. The Market Towns of Cheung Chau and Peng Chau elect 39 and 17 Kaifong Representatives respectively.

Detailed breakdown as follows:
 589 Existing Villages (including 574 Indigenous Villages and 15 Composite Indigenous Villages) elect both Indigenous Inhabitants Representatives and Resident Representatives
 106 Existing Villages elect only Resident Representatives
 14 Indigenous Villages elect only Indigenous Inhabitants Representatives
 2 Market Towns elect only Kaifong Representatives

Pre-election events
The nomination period of the election opened on 9 November and closed on 22 November 2018. 

Eddie Chu, member of the Legislative Council, and Paul Zimmerman, Southern District Councillor, initiated the Village Charter movement on 7 November 2018 under the slogan "Let's make our village clean and green", calling for the reform of rural representation system and the democratization of Rural Committees, which elected Rural Representatives will serve in.  This marked the first time pro-democracy camp coordinated in the rural election.

Disqualification 
Eddie Chu became the first candidate barred from running in the rural election because of their political stance, as he was disqualified from running in the election after electoral officials questioned his stance on Hong Kong independence and self-determination and invalidated his nomination for “implicitly” maintaining support for self-determination. Chu branded the decision "ridiculous" for "disqualifying an incumbent legislator from running for the post of a village chief". The village election process was temporarily put on hold as government considered Chu's candidacy.

Chu later filed an election petition to the High Court over the disqualification, but withdrew in January 2020 after taking into account the outcome of the election petition by Agnes Chow, which ruled Returning Officer can disqualify candidates.

Voting 
The election took place on three consecutive Sundays in January 2019. 

Only 436 seats were open for contest with a total of 836 candidates, as 105 villages received no valid nomination and hence no elections were held, while nearly a thousand candidates were uncontested, including the Market Town of Peng Chau.

Result 
Turnout of the election is as follows:

Pro-democracy camp 
For candidates of the pro-democracy Village Charter, none successfully won a seat. William Ho did not gather enough nominations and was not enlisted as a candidate. In Pan Long Wan, Paul Zimmerman was defeated overwhelmingly by 12–110 after admitting no hope to win the election, similar for Carol Ho of Pak Kong by 23–110. Herve Bouvresses, running for re-election, and David Newbery lost by 10–16 and 10–14 respectively.

Stanley Ho Wai-hong from the Labour Party, who advocated ending indigenous rights of housing, was defeated by conservative in Ko Tong of Sai Kung. Sum Shui-ying of Democratic Party was declared elected as the sole candidate of Wa Mei Shan in Fanling, who promised to bring voices of democracy into the Rural Committee.

Half a year after the election defeat amidst the pro-democracy protest movement, Carol Ho received threats accusing her of supporting Hong Kong independence and hampering the peace of the village.

Cheung Chau 
With 65 candidates vying for 39 seats, Cheung Chau is one of the closely watched races. Voter shall cast ballot for 39 candidates under block voting system.

Reformist Cheung Chau Synergy, led by pro-business Cheung Chau South District Councillor Kwong Koon-wan, and conservative Cheung Chau Community Alliance, by pro-Beijing Cheung Chau North District Councillor Lee Kwai-chun, fielded 33 and 32 candidates respectively. As the two Cheung Chau constituencies in the District Council would merge into one in 2019 local election, the poll became increasingly competitive.

Community Alliance eventually took up 25 seats, while Synergy only won 14 but made a net gain of 8 seats compared to the last election. Perceived to be risky after losing support,  the conservatives retained their majority and the control of Cheung Chau Rural Committee.

Ping Yeung 
In September 2018, Chan Kam-wah of Ping Yeung in Ta Kwu Ling declared breaking off parental relationship with his son, North District Councillor Frank Chan Shung-fai. Senior Chan slammed "unfilial" Frank Chan in the statement on newspaper, while Frank Chan said it was an attempt by his father to pressurize his ex-wife to turn over her possessions over a financial dispute with the new wife.

The election for Ping Yeung Indigenous Inhabitants Representatives saw eight candidates running for four seats. The four on Frank Chan's team were defeated, while Chan Kam-wah was re-elected with the highest number of votes amongst all. Despite so, Frank Chan's sister Chan Yuet-ming was elected as Resident Representative by one vote. Chan Kam-wah eventually his re-election bid as chairman of Ta Kwu Leng Rural Committee, and gave way to his daughter Chan Yuet-ming to become the first Rural Committee chairwoman in Hong Kong's history.

Rural Committee chairman 
Chairman of all 27 Rural Committees were elected by April 2019, who would serve as ex-officio members of respective District Councils and as members of the Heung Yee Kuk.

References 

Elections in Hong Kong
2019 elections in Hong Kong
2019 elections in China
January 2019 events in China